SS Hebble was a freight vessel built for the Goole Steam Shipping Company Limited in 1891.

History

Hebble was built by William Dobson and Company in Walker Yard for the Goole Steam Shipping Company Limited and launched on 7 July 1891.

Hebble was obtained by the Lancashire and Yorkshire Railway in 1905.

On 12 August 1908, Hebble was damaged in a collision with the Yarmouth steamer Armourer in the River Humber.

References

1891 ships
Steamships of the United Kingdom
Ships built on the River Tyne
Ships of the Lancashire and Yorkshire Railway
Maritime incidents in 1908
Maritime incidents in 1917
Ships sunk by mines
World War I shipwrecks in the North Sea